Synchronized swimming at the 2017 World Aquatics Championships was held between 14 and 22 July 2017 in Budapest, Hungary.

Schedule
Nine events were held.

All time are local (UTC+2).

Medal summary

Medal table

Events

References

External links
Official website

 
Synchronised swimming
Synchronised swimming at the World Aquatics Championships
2017 in synchronized swimming